The 1997–98 Ohio Bobcats men's basketball team represented Ohio University in the college basketball season of 1997–98. The team was coached by Larry Hunter and played their home games at the Convocation Center. They finished the season 5–21 and finished tied for last in the MAC regular season with a conference record of 3–15.  21 losses is the most in Ohio history.

Roster

Schedule

|-
!colspan=9 style=|Non-conference regular season

Source:

Statistics

Team Statistics
Final 1997–98 Statistics

Source

Player statistics

Source

References

Final 1998 Division I Men's Basketball Statistics Report
Ohio Record Book 

Ohio Bobcats men's basketball seasons
Ohio
Bob
Bob